Jérémie Romand (born February 28, 1988) is a French professional ice hockey left winger who currently plays for Gothiques d'Amiens of the Ligue Magnus.

Romand previously played for Dragons de Rouen, Drakkars de Caen, Brest Albatros Hockey and Aigles de Nice. He also played for France at the 2011 IIHF World Championship.

References

External links

1988 births
Living people
Les Aigles de Nice players
Brest Albatros Hockey players
Dragons de Rouen players
Drakkars de Caen players
French ice hockey left wingers
Gothiques d'Amiens players
Sportspeople from Haute-Savoie